The Marinko Sudac Collection, based in Zagreb, Croatia, has been created with a clear collecting strategy based on the region of Central and Eastern Europe, additionally spanning from the Baltic area to the Black Sea. The guiding principle of the Collection is systematic exploration, researching, and promotion of the avant-garde practices which have been marginalized, forbidden, and at times completely negated due to the historical, social and political circumstances. In this context, the Marinko Sudac Collection gives the most complete and comprehensive overview on the art of this region. The Collection starts at 1909, and it show the continuity from the first Avant-Gardes, through neo-avant-garde and New Artistic Practices, ending with the fall of the Berlin Wall. The global uniqueness of the Marinko Sudac Collection is also seen in the kind of media it contains. It contains not only traditional artworks, such as paintings, sculptures, and photographs, but it gives equal importance to documentary and archival material. Great importance is put on these almost forgotten media, which enable research of specific phenomena, artists and the socio-political situation which affected this type of art. The Collection contains a great number of museological units, and it treats the documentary and archival material on the same level as traditional artworks. By examining the units contained in the Marinko Sudac Collection, one can read not only the art scene or the art production of a certain artist, but the full status of the society, the socio-political atmosphere of the region in which this art was created in.

This Collection is not merely a process of gathering artworks, but a contextualisation of the art of region in the global history of art and an effort of putting it on its deserved place in history. The aim of the Marinko Sudac Collection is to preserve the cultural heritage of the Central and Eastern European region from globalisation, by maintaining it in a contextual unity. The end goal is to place the Collection in an architectural, physical building of the Museum of Avant-Garde, in which this art will be valorised, museologically processed, open to researchers and experts, and presented to the public. A part of the works from the Marinko Sudac Collection is available in digital form on an innovative platform of the Virtual Museum of Avant-Garde (www.avantgarde-museum.com/en), which unites the work of the Virtual Museum of the Avant-Garde, the Marinko Sudac Collection, and the Institute for the Research of the Avant-Garde, with a goal to form a central database for the researching of the phenomena of the Avant-Garde. The Marinko Sudac Foundation was established in 2022.

Alongside more than 170 already accomplished successful collaborations with museum institutions and independently organized exhibition in great museum centres such as Tate Modern, London; Ludwig Museum, Budapest, Haus der Kunst, Munich; ZKM, Karlsruhe, Deutsches Filmmuseum Frankfurt, Museum of Modern Art, Warsaw, Museum of Contemporary Art, Zagreb,... or exhibitions of the Collection in unofficial places such as Marshall Josip Broz Tito's boat Seagull (At Standstill exhibition, Rijeka, 2011), Marinko Sudac is also an editor of numerous publications – art monographs, exhibition catalogues and collections of texts, and an author of a successful artist residence project Artist on Vacation, held annually since 2012, which hosted over 90 of the leading world artists which continue the tradition of the Avant-Garde.

Collection strategy 
The Collection's interest extends from the Baltic area to the Black Sea, with particular emphasis on Central and Eastern Europe. The collector's strategy is directed towards systematic exploration, research, and promotion of Avant-Garde practices that have been marginalized, forbidden, and at times completely rejected, due to historical, social and political circumstances. In this respect, the Collection is, in relation to already existing European art collections, regionally cohesive, and presents an inexhaustible resource for the research of Avant-Garde art and a dynamic platform for the exchange of knowledge on the phenomenon of Avant-Garde. This can be seen in numerous topical and retrospective exhibitions, organised events, followed by connected detailed publications or studies, articles in professional journals, some published in the framework of research projects and collaborations with numerous important institutions, experts, theoreticians, art historians, and artists from the entire world.

Museum of Avant-Garde 
The Virtual Museum of Avant-Garde, based on the Marinko Sudac Collection, was created in 2009. It presents the digital database of the Collection through which you can see the overview of Avant-Garde art in the countries of former Yugoslavia structured according to authors, artworks, time periods, and geographical areas, as well as links and influences of the artists with cultural happenings and artistic centers in the region and the world. The website, beside the high-quality digitized artworks, contains biographies and bibliographies, alongside the connection of the artists with other artists, art institutions and cultural forums, as well as selected publications.

The online database show only a small part of the Collection. Speedy digitization of the material is crucial to accomplish the Museum's main aim, which is to make it a centre for information on the regional Avant-Garde practices.

The Virtual Museum of Avant-Garde is a free online platform to research all forms of Avant-Garde art of Eastern and Central Europe, to show connection with the rest of the world, to be a place for free thought and presenting the relevant cultural phenomena of Avant-Garde thought and artistic doing, to be a space for creating and publishing expert materials and research on the phenomena of the Avant-Garde. In its work, the Virtual Museum of Avant-Garde managed to become a meeting point of experts and intellectuals from the region and the artists, as well as interested public who can, in one place, find many information on the Avant-Garde movement in this area.

Artists in the Marinko Sudac Collection

Former Yugoslavia

Hungary

Czechoslovakia

Poland

Russia

United States

United Kingdom

Romania

Ukraine

Turkey

The Netherlands

Italy

Switzerland

Germany

Bulgaria

France

Denmark

Austria

Finland

Japan

Projects 
Since its beginning, the Marinko Sudac Collection has been open to collaboration with various institutions. Through the years, the works from the Collection have been exhibited both locally and internationally.

The collection has been recognised as a good partner and the growing interest in different types of collaborations (exhibitions, conferences, projects, movies, publications) shows the quality of the Collections and its open character.

List of independently organised projects 

 The Legacy of the OHO Group - Marko Pogačnik, Portal of Peace; David Nez, Zoology of Absence, Ras Al Khaimah Fine Arts Festival, Ras Al Khaimah, United Arab Emirates, 2023
 Gorgona. The Solitude of Thought. On the Concept of an Experimental Re-examination of the Arts, Ras Al Khaimah Fine Arts Festival, Ras Al Khaimah, United Arab Emirates, 2023
 The Freedom of My Mind. Avant-garde Women Artists from the Marinko Sudac Collection, Vršilnica, Zaprešić, Croatia, 2023
 62nd Poreč Annale: New Fundamental Tendencies, Istrian Assembly Hall; Small Gallery, Poreč, Croatia, 2022
 Stano Filko. Marinko Sudac Collection, Zuccato Gallery, Poreč, Croatia, 2022
 Bosch+Bosch Group. Marinko Sudac Collection, Museum of Art Olomouc, Olomouc, Czech Republic, 2022
 Lucia di Luciano, Giovanni Pizzo - Programmed Art, 1964 - 1967 | Marinko Sudac Collection, Varaždin City Museum, Exhibition Salon of the Sermage Palace, 2022
 Lucia di Luciano & Giovanni Pizzo "Programmed Art" | Marinko Sudac Collection, "Josip Račić" Gallery of the National Museum of Modern Art, Zagreb, Croatia, 2022
 Boris Demur – Analytical Works. Marinko Sudac Collection, Zuccato Gallery, Poreč, Croatia, 2021
Commemorating the 100 years of the "Zenit" magazine, National Museum of Modern Art, Zagreb, Croatia, 2021
Bosch + Bosch. Hungarian Art Movement in Vojvodina, Hungarian Cultural Institute, Brussels, Belgium, 2020
Boris Demur. Analytical workd | Art Photo Budapest presentation, Millenáris park, Budapest, Hungary / virtual, 2020
ICDHS 12 Conference, online project, Zagreb, Croatia, 2020
Bogdanka Poznanović (1930. – 2013.), Marinko Sudac Collection, Zuccato Gallery, Poreč, Croatia, 2020
Gorgona. Works from the Marinko Sudac Collection, Profile Foundation, Warsaw, Poland, 2019
 Philip Corner – No Notes Nonce | Other Aspects, Holland House, Sisak, Croatia, 2019
 Radoslav Putar and Miljenko Horvat. A Retrospective, Varaždin City Museum, Varaždin, Croatia, 2019
 Gorgona 1959 – 1968. Independent Artistic Practices in Zagreb. Retrospective Exhibition from the Marinko Sudac Collection, Kassák Museum, Budapest, Hungary, 2019
 Bosch+Bosch Group and the Vojvodina Neo-Avantgarde MovementT, Ludwig Museum, Budapest, Hungary, 2019
 The Oho Group, 1962 – 1971, Marinko Sudac Collection, Zuccato Gallery, Poreč, Croatia, 2019
 "Artist on Vacation 2018" by Valamar, Museum of Contemporary Art, Zagreb, Croatia, 2019
Autopsia Archive 1979 – 1989, City Gallery Striegl, Sisak, Croatia, 2019
Paralelni narativi. Galerija umjetnina / Kolekcija Marinko Sudac, Gallery of Fine Arts, Split, Croatia, 2019
Andrzej Lachowicz – A Form of Consciousness, Zuccato Gallery, Poreč, Croatia, 2018
"Artist on Vacation 2017" by Valamar, Museum of Contemporary Art, Zagreb, Croatia, 2018
"In Memoriam" – Josip Vaništa, Šira Gallery, Zagreb, Croatia, 2018
Živko Grozdanić Gera – Allegories, Zuccato Gallery, Poreč, Croatia, 2017
Radomir Damnjanović Damnjan, Paintings. 2009 – 2012, Zuccato Gallery, Poreč, Croatia, 2017
Artist on Vacation 2016 \ Valamar, Museum of Contemporary Art Zagreb, Zagreb, Croatia, 2017
Jiří Valoch – The Power of the Powerless, Marinko Sudac Collection, Museum of Contemporary Art Zagreb, Zagreb, Croatia, 2017
Oho Films. A Retrospective (1963–1971) Marinko Sudac Collection, French Pavilion, Zagreb, Croatia, 2017
El nem kötelezett művészet – Marinko Sudac gyűjteménye, Ludwig Museum – Museum of Contemporary Art, Budapest, Hungary, 2017
Miljenko Horvat. Gorgona and After. Photographs | Marinko Sudac Collection, Photo Gallery Lang, Samobor, Croatia, 2017
Slovakian Neo-Avant-Garde | Rudolf Sikora, Július Koller and the First Open Studio, Museum of Contemporary Art Zagreb, Zagreb, Croatia, 2017
Non-Aligned Modernity . Eastern-European Art and Archives from the Marinko Sudac Collection, FM Center for Contemporary Art, Milan, Italy, 2016
Jiří Valoch – The Power of the Powerless, Zuccato Gallery, Poreč, Croatia, 2016
Neo Dada: Gorgona | Absurd Freedom, Gallery Thalberg, Zürich, Switzerland, 2016
Julius Koller U. F. O. – naut J. K.?, Art Market Budapest 2015, Budapest, Hungary, 2016
Radical Practices from Marinko Sudac Collection, A38 Ship Gallery, Budapest, Hungary, 2016
Gorgona, Museum of Contemporary Art Zagreb, Zagreb, Croatia, 2015
Artist on Vacation 2015, Museum of Contemporary Art Zagreb, Zagreb, Croatia, 2015
Gorgona – Then and Now, Villa Polesini, Poreč, Croatia, 2015
Blue Noses – From the Transition's Archives, Gallery of Fine Arts of the National Museum Zadar, Zadar, Croatia, 2015
Vlado Martek | Read the Visual, Typholological Museum, Zagreb, Croatia, 2015
Bucan Art from Marinko Sudac Collection, Gallery of Fine Arts, Split, Croatia, 2015
Jiří Valoch – Word as a Painting, Gallery of Fine Arts, Split, Croatia, 2015
Stano Filko – Transcendence, Art Market Budapest, Budapest, Hungary, 2014
First World War and Avant-Garde Art, Museum of Contemporary Art Zagreb, Zagreb, Croatia, 2014
Artist on Vacation 2014, Museum of Contemporary Art Zagreb, Zagreb, Croatia, 2014
Bucan Art,, 2014Villa Polesini, Poreč, Croatia
Transition and Transition – Oleg Kulig, Josip Vaništa, Blue Noses, Ludwig Museum – Museum of Contemporary Art, Budapest, Hungary, 2014
Good Choice! Examples of Commercial Communication from the 50s and 60s, Fuliranje, Zagreb, Croatia, 2013
Artist on Vacation 2013, Museum of Contemporary Art Zagreb, Zagreb, Croatia, 2013
Transition – Oleg Kulig, Josip Vaništa, Blue Noses, Villa Polesini, Poreč, Croatia, 2013
Bauhaus by Ivana Tomljenović Meller, Worker's Gallery, Zagreb, Croatia, 2012 – 2013
The manifestation of a spiral due to Y. Klein – Boris Demur, Damian Nenadić, Foto galerija Lang, Samobor, Croatia, 2012
Artist on Vacation 2012, Museum of Contemporary Art Zagreb, Zagreb, Croatia, 2012
Ivan Kožarić, Novi Spa & Resorts, Novi Vinodolski, Croatia, 2012
Marinko Sudac Collection: Permanent Avant-Garde, KUAD Gallery, Istanbul, Turkey, 2012
Circles of Interference. The Marinko Sudac Collection, the Petőfi Literary Museum – Kassák Museum, Budapest, Hungary, 2012
Standstill – Activist art from the Marinko Sudac Collection, "Seagull" ship, Rijeka, Croatia, 2011
Branimir Donat and Visual Poetry, Glyptotheque HAZU, Zagreb, Croatia, 2011
Oh After Oho, Museum of Contemporary Art Zagreb, Zagreb, Croatia, 2010
Aleksandar Srnec: Experimental Reality, Museum Lapidarium, Novigrad, Croatia, 2010
Ivana Tomljenović Meller, Photographs and Photomontages Bauhaus, Dessau 1929–1930, Photo Gallery Lang, Samobor, Croatia, 2010
The Present Absence – Aleksandar Srnec, Museum of Contemporary Art Zagreb, Zagreb, Croatia, 2010
Aleksandar Srnec, Zuccato Gallery, Poreč, Croatia, 2008
The Present Absence – Aleksandar Srnec, The Gallery of Old and New Masters, Varaždin, Croatia, 2008
Marginal Specificities – Regional Avant-Garde Art 1915–1989, Museum of Modern and Contemporary Art, Rijeka, Croatia, 2007
Marginal Specificities: Avant-Garde Art of ex-Yugoslavia 1914–1989, Museum of Contemporary Art of Vojvodina, Novi Sad, Serbia, 2006
Vlado Martek... The Artist as a Mobile Map, Zlatno oko Gallery, Novi Sad, Srbija, 2006
Marginal Specificities – Regional Avant-Garde Art, Gallery Centre Varaždin, Varaždin, Croatia, 2005
Marijan Molnar, Vila Oršić, Varaždin, Croatia, 2004
Vlado Martek, Vila Oršić, Varaždin, Croatia, 2004

List of collaborations with institutions (loans of works from the Marinko Sudac Collection) 
Valoch & Valoch: Archeologie a konceptuální umění, Pražákův palác, Brno, Czech Republic, 2022
ART CONTACT - Networking of Artistic Ideas, Museum of Contemporary Art, Zagreb, Croatia, 2021
Poetry and Performance. The Eastern-European Perspective, Kultura Medialna, Dnipro, Ukraine, 2021
Our Other Us – Art Encounters Biennial, Art Encounters Foundation Timișoara, Timișoara, Romania, 2021
THE ANTINOMIES OF ∞ AUTONOMY, "Cvijeta Zuzorić" Art Pavilion, Belgrade, Serbia, 2021
51st Annale: Wasting Life Away, Istrian Assembly Hall, Poreč, Croatia, 2021
Ivan Kožarić: A Retrospective – One of the 100 Possible Ones, Museum of Contemporary Art, Zagreb, Croatia
Költészet és performansz – a kelet-európai perspektíva, Kassák Museum, Budapest, Hungary, 2021
Ivan Kožarić. To Fly into the Ether or Stay on Earth, Museum of Modern and Contemporary Art, Rijeka, Croatia, 2021
Pre-contemporary Action – Postmodern Reaction, National Museum of Modern Art, Zagreb, Croatia, 2021
Poetry and Performance. Eastern-European Perspective, Oblastní galerie Liberec, Liberec, The Czech Republic, 2020
1. otvorený ateliér 1970 – 2020, Galéria 19, Bratislava, Slovakia
 The Analogical Mirrors, Yamanaka Suplex, Otsu-city, Shiga, Japan, 2020
 Portraits and the Sky: Yugoslav Experimental Films, 1960s–1990s, Berkeley Art Museum and Pacific Film Archive (BAMPFA), Berkley, California, USA, 2020
Praksa teorije: Matko Meštrović i dizajn, Croatian Designers Association, Zagreb, Croatia, 2020
Wiek półcienia. Sztuka w czasach planetarnej zmiany, Museum of Modern Art, Warsaw, Poland, 2020
Teresa Tyszkiewicz: dzień po dniu, Muzeum Sztuki in Łódź, Łódź, Poland, 2020Poetry and Performance. The Eastern European Perspective, Wroclaw Contemporary Museum, Wrocław, Poland, 2020
The Penumbral Age. Art in the Time of Planetary Change, Museum of Modern Art, Warsaw, Poland, 2020
Teresa Tyszkiewicz: Day After Day, Museum of Art in Łódź, Łódź, Poland, 2020
Vlado Martek Exhibition with Many Titles, City Art Gallery of Ljubljana, Ljubljana, Slovenia, 2020
City Visions – City Iconography II (1950 – 2000+), Modern Gallery, Zagreb, Croatia, 2019
 Years of Disarray 1908 – 1928. Avant-gardes in Central Europe, Jannus Pannonius Museum, Pécs, Hungary, 2019
 Vertigo. Op Art and a History of Optical Illusion 1520 -1970, Kunstmuseum Stuttgart, Stuttgart, Germany, 2019
 See You after the Revolution! 100 years of Bauhaus, Arsenal Gallery, Białystok, Poland, 2019
 Through a Forest Wilderness – Aktionen im Wald. Performance, Konzeptkunst, Events. 1960 – ∞, Kunsthalle Wilhelmshaven + Neuenburger Holz, Wilhelmshaven, Germany, 2019
 The Years of Dissaray 1908–1928. Avantgardes in Central Europe, Bratislava City Gallery, Bratislava, Slovakia, 2019
 Vertigo Op Art and a History of Deception 1520–1970, mumok – museum moderner kunst stiftung ludwig wien, Vienna, Austria, 2019
 Vlado Martek: Exhibition with Many Titles, Museum of Modern and Contemporary Art, Rijeka, Croatia, 2019
Poetry & Performance. The Eastern European Perspective, Motorenhalle. Projektzentrum für zeitgenössische Kunst, Dresden Germany, 2019
Il Soggetto Imprevisto. 1978 Arte e Femminismo in Italia, FM Centro per l'Arte Contemporanea, Milan, Italy, 2019
Czas przełomu. Sztuka awangardy w Europie Środkowej 1908–1928, International Cultural Centre, Krakow, Poland, 2019
Goran Trbuljak: nikada do sada viđen rad neviđenog umjetnika, Museum of Modern and Contemporary Art, Rijeka, Croatia
Projekcije: Motika, Brakhage, Srnec Antun Motika i nasljeđe eksperimenta, Municipal Gallery Pula, Pula, Croatia
Recordings – New Artistic Practices from Yugoslavia, Fundacja Profile, Warsaw, Polan, 2018
Okruženju usprkos, HDLU, Zagreb, Croatia, 2018
Ilija Šoškić – Akcione forme, Museum of Contemporary Art, Belgrade; Museum of Contemporary Art Vojvodina, Novi Sad, Serbia, 2018
Through a Forest Wilderness – Actions in the Forest. Performance, Conceptual Art, Events. 1960 – ∞, Nikolskoer Landpartie, Berlin, Germany, 2018
Poetry & Performance. The Eastern European Perspective, Shedhalle Zurich, Zurich, Switzerland 2018
Marijan Molnar – Inventura, Gallery of Fine Arts, Split, Croatia, 2018
Years of Disarray / Between Anxiety and Delight: the Birth of the Modern Central European Citizen 1908–1928, Olomouc Museum of Art, Olomouc, Czech Republic, 2018
The Other Trans-Atlantic: Kinetic and Op Art in Eastern Europe and Latin America 1950s – 1970s, SESC Pinheiros – São Paulo, São Paulo, Brazil, 2018
Farewell to Spring | 1968 in the Eastern Block, Galeria Centralis, Vera and Donald Blinken Open Society Archives, Budapest, Hungary, 2018
Marko Pogačnik – Tretja umetnost, Galerija Prešernovih nagrajencev Kranj, Kranj, Slovenia, 2018
CUT / REZ – Examples of collage in artistic practices in Central and Eastern Europe from the Avant-garde until today, Museum of Contemporary Art, Zagreb, Croatia, 2018
ŽELJKO KIPKE Diagnosis: Double Vision, Gallery of Arts, Split, Croatia, 2018
The Other Trans-Atlantic, Garage, Moscow, Russia, 2018
Poezija & performans. Istočnoevropska perspektiva, Student's Cultural Centre, Podroom Gallery, Belgrade, Serbia. 2018
Novi Sad Orpheuses – Új Symposion (1965–1992), the Vojvodina journal, Ferenczy Múzeum, Szentendre, Hungary, 2018
Projekcije: Antun Motika in dediščina eksperimenta, Škuc Gallery, Ljubljana, Slovenia, 2018
Poézia a performancia. Východoeurópska perspektíva, Nová synagóga, Žilina, Slovakia, 2017 – 2018
You've Got 1243 Unread Messages. Last Generation Before the Internet. Their Lives, Latvian National Museum of Art, Riga, Latvia, 2017
Párhuzamos avantgárd – Pécsi Műhely 1968–1980, Savaria Múzeum, Szombathely, Hungary, 2017
Rejestracje, Fundacja Profile, Warsaw, Poland, 2017
Today's Yesterday – The 1st Anren Biennale, Anren, Chengdu, China, 2017
The Other Transatlantic. Kinetic & Op Art in Central & Eastern Europe and Latin America, Museum of Modern Art in Warsaw, Warsaw, Poland, 2017
Kassákizmus 1., Petőfi Irodalmi Múzeum, Budapest, Hungary, 2017
Exat 51. Experimental Atelier Synthesis Of The Arts In Post-War Yugoslavia. Ideology, Abstraction And Architecture, Museum Haus Lange, Krefeld, Germany, 2017
Natural Histories. Traces of the Political, mumok – Museum moderner Kunst Stiftung Ludwig, Vienna, Austria, 2017
Gutljaj jedan, ali vrijedan. Segestica Sisak 1917.-2017., Sisak City Museum, Sisak, Croatia, 2017
Párhuzamos avantgárd – Pécsi Műhely 1968 – 1980, m21 Galéria, Pecs, Hungary
Through a Forest Wildernesss – Actions in the Forest. Performance, Conceptual Art, Events. 1960 – ∞, Brandenburgischer Kunstverein Potsdam, Germany, 2017
Viva Arte Viva, 57th Venice Biennial, Venice, Italy, 2017
Parallel Avant-garde – Pécs Workshop 1968–1980, Ludwig Museum – Museum of Contemporary Art, Budapest, Hungary, 2017
Projections – Antun Motika and the legacy of experiment, Museum of Modern and Contemporary Art, Rijeka, Croatia, 2017
Drago Dellabernardina, P74 Gallery, Ljubljana, Slovenia, 2017
Facing the future. Art in Europe 1945–1968, Pushkin State Museum of Fine Arts, Moscow, Russia, 2017
Slovenia and Non-Aligned Pop, Umetnostna galerija Maribor, Slovenia, 2016 – 2017
Art in Europe 1945–1968: Facing the Future, ZKM, Karlsruhe, Germany, 2016
Postwar: Art between the Pacific and the Atlantic, 1945–1965, Haus der Kunst, Munich, Germany, 2016
Notes From The Underground. Art And Alternative Music in Eastern Europe 1968–1994, Muzeum Sztuki w Łodzi, Łodz, Poland, 2016
Ivo Gattin, Adris Gallery, Rovinj, Croatia, 2016
Politiche della Natura, Fondazione Zimei, Pescara, Italy, 2016
ecologEAST – Art and Nature Beyond the Wall, PAV Parco Arte Vivente, Turin, Italy, 2016
Monuments Should Not Be Trusted, Nottingham Contemporary, Nottingham, United Kingdom, 2016
Ludwig Goes Pop + The East Side Story, Ludwig Museum – Museum of Contemporary Art, Budapest, Hungary, 2016
The EY Exhibition: The World Goes Pop, Tate Modern, London, United Kingdom, 2015 – 2016
Phlogiston, Gallery of Fine Arts, Splits, Croatia, 2015
Đuro Seder – A Retrospective Exhibition, 1953–2015, Modern Gallery, Zagreb, Croatia, 2015
The 80's – Sweet decadence of postmodernism, HDLU, Zagreb, Croatia, 2015
Željko Kipke: Prints, Gramophones and Tonsures, Croatian Academy of Sciences and Art -Glyptotheque, Zagreb, Croatia, 2015
Art Has No Alternative (An Archive of Artists in Action), tranzit.sk Gallery, Bratislava, Slovakia, 2015
Personal Cuts*, Carré d’Art-Musée d’art contemporain, Nîmes, France, 2014
Željko Kipke: Graphics '77, Grafički Kolektiv Gallery, Belgrade, Serbia, 2014
Conscious Hallucinations. Filmic Surrealism, Deutsches Filmmuseum Frankfurt, Frankfurt, Germany, 2014
Love Towards Subversion, Kazamat Gallery, Osijek, Croatia, 2014
Tabula Rasa: Self-Reflective, Primary and Analytical in Croatian Art, Museum of Contemporary Art of Istria, Pula, Croatia, 2014
Ivan Kožarić. Freedom Is a Rare Bird, Haus der Kunst, München, Germany, 2013
Tabula rasa: The Primary and Analytical in Croatian Art, Glyptotheque HAZU, Zagreb, Croatia, 2013
Antun Motika: Experiments, Museum of Modern and Contemporary Art, Pula, Croatia, 2013
Josip Vaništa: Abolition of Retrospective, Museum of Contemporary Art Zagreb, Zagreb, Croatia, 2013
Love Towards Subversion, dr. Vinko Perčić Gallery, Subotica, Serbia, 2013
The Freedom of Sound – John Cage behind the Iron Curtain, Ludwig Museum – Museum of Contemporary Art, Budapest, Hungary, 2012 – 2013
Željko Kipke – Police Back Yard, Art Pavilion in Zagreb, Zagreb, Croatia, 2012
Željko Kipke: Police Back-Yard, Museum of Contemporary Art of Vojvodina, Novi Sad, Serbia, 2012
High times: Reflections of psychedelia in socialist Yugoslavia 1966–1976, Škuc Gallery, Ljubljana, Slovenia, 2011 – 2012
Socialism and Modernity, Museum of Contemporary Art, Zagreb, 2012
Tune in Screening: Psychedelic Moving Images from Socialist Yugoslavia 1966.–1976., Land of Tomorrow, Lexington, USA, 2011
Volume Collection, Museum of Modern and Contemporary Art, Rijeka, Croatia, 2011
Spaceship Earth, Centre of Contemporary Art Znaki Czasu, Torun, Poland, 2011
Public matters!, Gallery of Contemporary Art, Celje, Slovenia, 2011
Tune in Screening: Psychedelic Moving Images from Socialist Yugoslavia 1966.–1976., Stephan Stoyanov Gallery, New York City, 2010
Slought in Transit, HDLU, Zagreb, Hrvatska, 2010
From Art to Life. Hungarians at the Bauhaus, Janus Pannonius Museum, Pécs, Hungary, 2010
As soon as I open my eyes I see a film. Experiment in the art of Yugoslavia in the 60s and 70s, Museum of Modern Art, Warsaw, Poland, 2008
Vlado Martek: A Retrospective 1973 – 2007, Croatian Academy of Sciences and Art -Glyptotheque, Zagreb, Croatia, 2008
Avant-Garde Tendencies in Croatian Art, Klovićevi Dvori Gallery, Zagreb, Croatia, 2007
On unknown works, Gallery Nova, Zagreb, Croatia, 2006
Demur, Modern Gallery, Zagreb, Croatia, 2004
From Futurism to Fontana, Apedemak Gallery, Zagreb, Croatia, 2002

Collaborations on documentaries 

HRT show Jedno djelo – episodes "Josip Vaništa, Beskonački štap / U čast Manetu", "Miljenko Horvat – Gorgonska polja", "Antun Motika – Eksperimenti"
Pumpkin on the Hot Roof of the World – Poetry and the Eternal Life of Tomaž Šalamun, directors: Nejc Saje, Jeffrey Young; production: Viva Videnović (Strup)
The Other Line, documentary film, director and writer: Nenad Milošević
 Artist on Vacation, documentary film, directors: Sandra Bastašić, Damian Nenadić
 Gorgona, documentary film, director and editor Ana Marija Habjan

Publications 
As part of its activities, the interconnected institutions of the Museum of Avant-Garde, Marinko Sudac Collection, and the Institute for the Research of the Avant-Garde publish various types of publications – artist monographs, exhibition catalogues etc.

The aim of these publishing projects is to present relevant artists, artist groups, artistic movements and developments of the former Yugoslavia region, as well as of Eastern and Central Europe. By presenting them through publications, the aim is to provide them with better international recognition and valorisations, so they could be placed in their rightful position in the global art scene.

Artist monographs 

 Ješa Denegri, "Gorgona", Agroinova d.o.o, edition: ArtInova, Zagreb,
 Ješa Denegri, Feđa Vukić, Hrvoje Turković – Aleksandar Srnec
 Miško Šuvaković, "Bogdanka i Dejan Poznanović : umetnost, mediji i aktivizam na kraju moderne"
 Želimir Koščević, Vladimir Gudac, "Budić : između geste i programa"

Exhibition catalogues 

62nd Poreč Annale: New Fundamental Tendencies (ISBN 978-953-56706-5-0; ISBN 978-953-6302-97-0)
Transition and Transition
 Circles of Interference
 At Standstill
 Rubne posebnosti : avangardna umjetnost u regiji : Muzej moderne i suvremene umjetnosti, Rijeka, 9. III.-15. IV. 2007.
 Avangardna umjetnost u regiji od 1915–1989 : kolekcija Marinko Sudac Galerijski Centar Varaždin (OCLC: 192137801)
 Rubne posebnosti : avangardna umetnost ex-Jugoslavije 1914–1989, katalog izložbe, Muzej savremene umjetnosti Vojvodine, Novi Sad
 Dobar izbor! Primjeri komercijalne komunikacije iz 50-ih i 60-ih : Kolekcija Marinko Sudac
 Od futurizma do Fontane, 2002

Expert publications 

 Ješa Denegri – "Prilozi za drugu liniju 3"
 Ješa Denegri – "Razlozi za drugu liniju : za novu umetnost sedamdesetih"
eds. Feđa Vukić, Iva Kostešić – "Lessons to Learn? Past Design Experiences and Contemporary Design Practice",Proceedings of the 12th International Conference on the History of Design and Design Studies, 2021.

Institute for the Research of the Avant-Garde editions / Druga linija | The Other Line 

 Radoslav Putar and Miljenko Horvat. A Retrospective
Ješa Denegri – "Prilozi za drugu liniju 4", 2020

Institute for the Research of the Avant-Garde 
The Institute for the Research of the Avant-Garde was founded in 2010, as part of the project with the aim to study, preserve, present, and popularize the regional Avant-Garde art through exhibitions, projects, and publications. Since its foundation, the Institute started or collaborated on over 130 projects, including: the organisation of the central event to commemorate the centenary of the First World War, which was the exhibition and the international conference "The First World War and Avant-garde Art: Deconstruction-Construction", participation in the international project of exhibitions "Years of Disarray" supported by the European Union, organisation or participation on exhibitions in over 15 countries and publishing activity. The institute is the holder of the "Artist on Vacation" project which has annually been hosting, since 2012, numerous notable artists of the neo-avant-garde and radical artistic practices.

Artist on Vacation 

Since 2012, the Artist on Vacation project has gathered, hosted and presented to the public a number of internationally prestigious artists who belong to the period of historical Avant-gardes, as well as artists who continue the practice of radical art and further develop its aesthetics. In the summer months, Poreč becomes a vacation spot for international artists. In collaboration with Valamar Riviera d.d., the Institute for the Research of Avant-Garde and Marinko Sudac Collection invite artists to spend a week at an exclusive hotel and vacation on the beautiful Istrian peninsula.

The project was created by Marinko Sudac as an extension of the activities of the Museum of Avant-Garde, the Institute for the Research of Avant-Garde and Marinko Sudac Collection. It complements the collection's mission, and gives affirmation to the artists in the social, cultural and artistic contexts. The mission of the Artists on Vacation project is to show the various legacies of the original Avant-Garde movement that have developed in different countries and contexts.

The driving force behind the project is to present the participating artists to the Croatian public. The project is an effort to connect all the activities that aim to bring together the historical avant-gardes and present them to the public in a direct way, outside of an institutional environment. Artists get an opportunity to meet other artists, but also theorists, art historians, and museum professionals. This exchange of ideas and influences brings about personal and artistic developments and paves way to new collaborations and projects. Every year, there is an exclusive one day exhibition organized during the Project.

Each year, at the end of the project, an exhibition of works created during the Artist on Vacation project, as well as a presentation of the participating artists is organized at the Museum of Contemporary Art Zagreb. A catalogue of a year's project is produced. The catalogue contains all the information about the project, the participating artists, their stay at Poreč, their works etc.

Every year, there is an exclusive one day exhibition organized during the project.
 2022 – "Stano Filko. Marinko Sudac Collection", Zuccato Gallery, Poreč
 2019 – "OHO Group, 1962 – 1971. Marinko Sudac Collection", Zuccato Gallery, Poreč
2018 – "Andrzej Lachowicz – A Form of Consciousness", Zuccato Gallery, Poreč
2017 – "Radomir Damnjanović Damnjan – Paintings, 2009 – 2012", Zuccato Gallery, Poreč; "Živko Grozdanić Gera – Allegories", Zuccato Gallery, Poreč
 2016 – "Jiří Valoch – The Power of the Powerless", Zuccato Gallery, Poreč 
 2015 – "Gorgona", Villa Polesini, Poreč
 2014 – "Bucan Art" – Boris Bućan, Villa Polesini, Poreč
 2013 – "Transition" – Vaništa, Kulik, Blue Noses, Villa Polesini, Poreč
 2012 – "Ivan Kožarić", Novi Spa & Resort, Novi Vinodolski

Participants 
In 2012: Attila Csernik (Serbia), Era Milivojević (Serbia), Radomir Damnjanović Damnjan (Italy), Ilija Šoškić (Italy), Ivan Kožarić (Croatia), János Sugár (Hungary), Vlado Martek (Croatia), Sándor Pinczehelyi (Hungary), Bálint Szombathy (Hungary), Romelo Pervolovici (Romania), Željko Kipke (Croatia).

In 2013: Željko Kipke (Croatia), Dan Perjovschi (Romania), Rudolf Sikora (Slovakia), Zdzisław Sosnowski (Poland), Blue Noses – Alexandr Shaburov and Vyacheslav Mizin (Russia), Oleg Kulik (Russia), Eric Andersen (Denmark), Marko Pogačnik (Slovenia), Živko Grozdanić (Serbia), Bálint Szombathy (Hungary), Ben Patterson (USA).

In 2014: Dragomir Ugren (Serbia), Gergelj Urkom (Serbia), Ulay (Germany), Era Milivojević (Serbia), Andraž Šalamun (Slovenia), David Nez (USA), Jiří Valoch (Czech Republic), Sven Stilinović (Croatia), Igor Grubić (Croatia).

In 2015: Verbumprogram (Serbia), Autopsia (Czech Republic), Teresa Tyszkiewicz (France), Ewa Partum (Poland), Przemysław Kwiek (Poland), Guia Rigvava (Austria), Jan Steklik (Czech Republic), Michail Grobman (Israel), Vadim Fiskin (Slovenia), Deimantas Narkevičius (Lithuania), Miloš Šejn (Czech Republic), Srečo Dragan (Slovenia), Milan Adamčiak (Slovakia).

In 2016: István Nádler (Hungary), Katalin Ladik (Hungary), Raša Todosijević (Serbia), Lev Nussberg (Russia), Philip Corner (USA), Rudolf Sikora (Slovakia), Slobodan Šijan (Serbia), Jarosław Kozłowski (Poland), Vladimir Gudac (Croatia)

In 2017: Ken Friedman (USA / Sweden), Miroslav Pavlović (Serbia), Zoran Todorović (Serbia), Andrien Sina (France), Nikola Džafo (Serbia), Tanja Ostojić (Serbia / Germany), Koji Kamoji (Japan / Poland), Józef Robakowski (Poland), Jusuf Hadžifejzović (Bosnia and Hercegovina), Boris Buden (Croatia)

In 2018: Marijan Molnar (Croatia), Vlado Martek (Croatia), Dragan Živadinov (Slovenia), Adela Jušić (B&H), Lana Čmajčanin (B&H), Dubravko Mataković (Croatia), Vladimir Nikolić (Serbia), Eulàlia Grau (Spain/Catalonia), Ludo Mich (Belgium), Tijana Petrović (Serbia), Vanja Žunić (Serbia), Milica Bilanović (B&H), Isidora Pejović (Serbia), Jelena Pantelić (Serbia), Vasily Slonov (Russia)

In 2019: Lipa Mill (B&H), Marjan Ciglič (Slovenia), Matjaž Hanžek (Slovenia), Marko Tadić (Croatia), Marijan Crtalić (Croatia), Sándor Pinczehelyi (Hungary), Miroslav Miša Savić (Serbia), Selma Selman (B&H/USA), Rena&Vladan (Serbia), Josef Dabernig (Austria), Igor Grubić (Croatia)

In 2022: Autopsia, Lucia di Luciano (Italy), Giovanni Pizzo (Italy), Naško Križnar (Slovenia), Tristan Pranyko (Croatia/Germany), Frieder Nake (German), Jorrit Tornquist (Austria/Italy)

Artist on Vacation Documentary 
Documentary film "Artist on Vacation" follows the activities of 11 world-renowned artists who have gathered in a luxurious Adriatic resort for a one-month vacation. Documentary is a collage of recorded activities and accomplishments of artists in the given space, which is a vacation destination of mostly high classes of society. The artists which we are following are: Attila Csernik (Serbia), Radomir Damnjanović Damnjan (Serbia), Željko Kipke (Croatia), Ivan Kožarić (Croatia), Vlado Martek (Croatia), Era Milivojević (Serbia), Romelo Pervolovici (Romania), Pinczehely Sandor (Hungary), Balint Szombathy (Hungary), Janos Sugar (Hungary) and Ilija Šoškić (Montenegro).

Directors: Sandra Bastašić, Damian Nenadić

Producers: Oliver Sertić, Vanja Jambrović

Co-producer and author of the concept: Marinko Sudac

Cinematographer: Damian Nenadić

Editor: Sandra Bastašić

Additional camera: Aleš Sudac

Production: Restart Laboratory and Marinko Sudac

in cooperation with: the Institute for researching the Avant-garde and Melange production

Duration: 30 min.

Shooting Format: HD

Artists Respond 
Artists Respond project was started by the Institute for the Research of the Avant-Garde and the Marinko Sudac Collection. Addressing the 2020 coronavirus global pandemic, the project aims to virtually present the thoughts and attitudes of neo-avant-garde artists, their energy and the message they have for the present moment.

This is the moment in which the world as we know it is on hold and the moment in which we need optimism and solidarity more than ever. We wish for the public to welcome the creative energy of these artists – artists who are ready to point out the state of things, to respond with art and creativity, as they have done in all difficult times in the past.

Participating artists: Philip Corner (US/IT), Eulàlia Grau (ES), Bálint Szombathy (ex-YU/HU), Ilya & Emilia Kabakov (ex-USSR/US), Sándor Pinczehelyi (HU), Vasily Slonov (RU), David Nez (US), Michail Grobman (ex-USSR/IS), Eric Andersen (BE/DK), Igor Makarevich (ex-USSR/RU), Santiago Sierra (ES), Milan Knížák (CZ), Artur Barrio (PT/BR), Autopsia, Dan Perjevoschi (RO), Miloš Šejn (CZ), Deimantas Narkevičius (LT), Francisco Infante-Arana (ex-USSR/RU), Sérgio Leitão (PT), Damir Muratov (RU), Kirsten Justesen (DK), Babi Badalov (AZ/FR) ... (to be updated).

Marinko Sudac Foundation 

The Marinko Sudac Foundation was established in 2022 with the general purpose of ensuring the conditions for permanent protection, preservation, scientific study, professional presentation and popularization of museological units and artists who are part of the Marinko Sudac Collection and other related artists, as well as those artists who act as a legacy of the practice of artists from the Marinko Sudac Collection.

Interviews 

Kožarićeva skulptura Zagreb bi mogla učiniti prepoznatljivim kao što je Kapoorova učinila Chicago, Večernji list, 2020
Marinko Sudac – Avangart Fenomenlerin Peşinde, Artam Global Art and Design, 2019
How Art History Is Being Re-Written with Eastern European Avant-Garde, Larry's list, 2019
Danas je promocija Gorgone, monografije o jednoj od najvažnijih umjetničkih grupa. Pričali smo s njenim urednikom, Telegram, 2018
Védőpajzsot akarok vonni az avantgárd köré – Beszélgetés Marinko Sudaccal, Artmagazin no. 96, 2017
 Marinko Sudac: Hrvatska avangarda integralni je i neodvojivi dio svjetske kulturne baštine, ViV, 2017
 A Gyũjtõ Álma. Interjú Marinko Sudac Horvát Mũgyũjtõvel, Ludwig Museum blog, 2017
 Interview with Marinko Sudac, Easttopics, 2017
 «Это проект размораживания утопии», Zerkalo, 2015
 Historical carriers of vital DNA. Interview with Marinko Sudac, SZUM, 2015
 Marinko Sudac: Ova izložba je kao da sam dobio Oscara, Večernji list, 2012

References

Conceptual art
Croatian art
Private collections in Croatia
Avant-garde art